Tic-Tac-Toe barb is a common name used for two separate species of barbs:

 Puntius ticto, also called the ticto barb or two spot barb, a subtropical brackish or freshwater barb from Southeast Asia.
 Puntius stoliczkanus, a tropical freshwater barb from Southeast Asia.